The Heidelstein, between Bischofsheim an der Rhön in the Bavarian county of Rhön-Grabfeld and Wüstensachsen in the Hessian county of Fulda, is a mountain,  high, on the state border in the mountains of the High Rhön, part of the German Central Upland range of Rhön. Its actual summit is in Bavaria. Sometimes its main peak is also called Schwabenhimmel.

On the Heidelstein are the Heidelstein Transmitter and a memorial of the  Rhön Club. On the northwestern slopes is the source of the River Ulster and on the western mountainside is the Rotes Moor Cross Country Skiing Centre.

References 

Mountains under 1000 metres
Mountains of Bavaria
Mountains and hills of the Rhön